Mohammed Khalil Ibrahim Al-Owais (born 10 October 1991) is a Saudi Arabian professional footballer who plays as a goalkeeper for Al-Hilal and the Saudi Arabia national team. He is known for his fast reflexes and vigilance in goal.

Club career
On 26 July 2017, Al-Owais joined Al-Ahli on a free transfer.

On 30 January 2022, Al-Owais joined Al-Hilal.

International career

2015-2016: FIFA World Cup 2018 qualifiers
Al-Owais was called up to the senior Saudi Arabia squad for a 2018 FIFA World Cup qualifier against Timor-Leste in September 2015. He made his debut against Japan in 2018 FIFA World Cup Qualification on 15 November 2016.

2018: FIFA World Cup 2018 performance
In May 2018, he was named in Saudi Arabia's preliminary squad for the 2018 World Cup in Russia. He originally served as the second choice behind regular Abdullah Al-Mayouf. However, Al-Mayouf performed horribly in the opener against Russia as Saudi Arabia suffered a humiliating 5–0 defeat. This led to Al-Owais being promoted as the first choice keeper instead. Al-Owais played in Saudi Arabia's 1–0 loss to Uruguay, which he made some good saves even though it was not enough to save Saudi Arabia from elimination. This was Al-Owais' only game in Russia.

2019: AFC Asian Cup 2019 performance
Al-Owais was included in Saudi Arabia's squad for the 2019 AFC Asian Cup in the United Arab Emirates. However, he produced a rather mediocre performance, only keeping clean sheet twice against weaker North Korea and Lebanon, as Saudi Arabia won both games. Against Qatar and Japan though, his luck ran out, conceding three goals, especially against the latter as his side lost an important game in the round of sixteen and thus Saudi Arabia crashed out.

2022: impressive FIFA World Cup 2022 performance
On 22 November 2022, during a 2022 FIFA World Cup match against Argentina, Al-Owais was named player of the match for his goalkeeping performance, which contributed to a historic 2–1 upset victory for Saudi Arabia. Along with his teammates, Al-Owais was reportedly gifted a Rolls-Royce as a result of the team’s significant victory. However, he then conceded twice to Poland and being the victim of Robert Lewandowski's first World Cup goal, as Saudi Arabia succumbed to the Poles and thus lost the original advantage gained from the shock win against Argentina.

Later, Al-Owais also gained prominence for his acrobatic saves against Mexico, which contributed to the elimination of Mexico from the group stage for the first time since 1978. However, Saudi Arabia still suffered a 2–1 defeat to the Mexicans in the end and as for the result, despite heroic efforts by Al-Owais, his team failed to progress from the group stage once again as Saudi Arabia stood bottom and was eliminated.

Personal life
Al-Owais is a Muslim.

Career statistics

Club
As of 30 January 2022.

International
Statistics accurate as of match played 30 November 2022.

Honours
Al-Shabab
 King Cup: 2014
 Saudi Super Cup: 2014
Al-Hilal
 Saudi Professional League: 2021-22

Individual

 The award for the best goalkeeper in the Saudi Professional League at the Sports Season Awards Ceremony for the 2017/18 season.
 King Salman Award for the best goalkeeper for the 2017/18 season.

References

External links

Living people
1991 births
Association football goalkeepers
Saudi Arabian footballers
Al-Shabab FC (Riyadh) players
Al-Ahli Saudi FC players
Al Hilal SFC players
Saudi Professional League players
People from Al-Hasa
2018 FIFA World Cup players
2019 AFC Asian Cup players
Saudi Arabia youth international footballers
Saudi Arabia international footballers
2022 FIFA World Cup players